Cyril Stacul (born 12 October 1984) is a French professional rugby league footballer who plays as a er or  for the Lézignan Sangliers in the Elite One Championship and has played for France at international level.

He previously played for the Catalans Dragons in the Super League and SM Pia XIII in the French top flight.

Stacul was named in the France training squad for the 2008 Rugby League World Cup.

He represented France again in the 2010 European Cup.

References

External links

Super League profile

1984 births
Living people
Baroudeurs de Pia XIII players
Catalans Dragons players
France national rugby league team players
French rugby league players
Lézignan Sangliers players
People from Villeneuve-sur-Lot
Rugby league centres
Rugby league fullbacks
Rugby league wingers
Sportspeople from Lot-et-Garonne